Matt Rasmussen is an American poet, and a founder of poetry publishing house Birds LLC. He was born in International Falls, Minnesota.  He obtained degrees from Emerson College and Gustavus Adolphus College, where he teaches.

Black Aperture, his first book, which is primarily concerned with his brother's suicide, was a 2013 National Book Award finalist and 2014 Minnesota Book Awards winner.

Works

Poetry 
 Fingergun (2006), chapbook.  Kitchen Press. 
 Black Aperture (2013). Baton Rouge:  Louisiana State University Press.

Awards and honors
 Walt Whitman Award, 2012
 National Book Award Finalist, 2013
 Minnesota Book Awards, 2014

References

External links 
 Matt Rasmussen's personal website
 Birds LLC website
 Profile at the Poetry Foundation website
 Profile at the National Book Foundation website

Year of birth missing (living people)
American male poets
Living people